The Popular Sin is a 1926 American comedy silent film directed by Malcolm St. Clair, written by Monta Bell and James Ashmore Creelman, and starring Florence Vidor, Clive Brook, Greta Nissen, Philip Strange, George Beranger, and Iris Gray. It was released on November 22, 1926, by Paramount Pictures.

Cast
Florence Vidor as Yvonne Montfort
Clive Brook as Jean Corot
Greta Nissen as La Belle Toulaise
Philip Strange as George Montfort
George Beranger as Alphonse Martin 
Iris Gray as Lulu

Preservation
With no prints of The Popular Sin located in any film archives, it is currently a lost film. Only fragments of reel 6 are in the Library of Congress collection.

References

External links 
 
 

1926 films
1920s English-language films
Silent American comedy films
Paramount Pictures films
Films directed by Malcolm St. Clair
American black-and-white films
Lost American films
American silent feature films
1926 comedy films
1926 lost films
Lost comedy films
1920s American films